Hainburg may refer to the following places:

 Hainburg an der Donau, Lower Austria, Austria
 Hainburg, Germany, Hesse, Germany